The president of the Institute of Mathematical Statistics is the highest officer of the Institute of Mathematical Statistics (IMS), and, together with the president-elect and past president, sets the directions for IMS during his or her term of office.

Duties
According to the IMS Handbook for Officers, Editors, Council Members and Committee Chairs (2003), the president makes appointments to IMS committee vacancies, represents the Society to other organizations such as the Committee of Presidents of Statistical Societies (COPSS) and the Conference Board of the Mathematical Sciences (CBMS). In addition, the president is an ex officio member of the corporation of the National Institute for Statistical Sciences (NISS), and is responsible for appointing another member of the corporation and a member of the NISS Board of Trustees.

List of presidents

20th century
1936	Henry L. Rietz
1937	Walter A. Shewhart
1938	Burton H. Camp
1939	Paul R. Rider
1940	Samuel S. Wilks
1941	Harold Hotelling
1942-43	Cecil C. Craig
1944	Walter A. Shewhart
1945	W. Edwards Deming
1946	William Gemmell Cochran
1947	William Feller
1948	Abraham Wald
1949	Jerzy Neyman
1950	Joseph Leo Doob
1951	Paul S. Dwyer
1952	Meyer A. Girshick
1953	Morris H. Hansen
1954	Edwin G. Olds
1955	Henry Scheffé
1956	David Blackwell
1957	Alexander Mood
1958	Leonard Jimmie Savage
1959	Jacob Wolfowitz
1960	John Tukey
1961	Erich L. Lehmann
1962	Albert H. Bowker
1963	Theodore W. Anderson
1964	Z. W. Birnbaum
1965	Herbert Solomon
1966	Herbert Robbins
1967	Ted Harris
1968	Herman Chernoff
1969	Wassily Hoeffding
1970	Jack Kiefer
1971	William Kruskal
1972	Raj Chandra Bose
1973	Lucien Le Cam
1974	R. R. Bahadur
1975	Frederick Mosteller
1976	Donald L. Burkholder
1977	C. R. Rao
1978	Elizabeth Scott
1979	Samuel Karlin
1980	George E. P. Box
1981	Peter J. Bickel
1982	Mark Kac
1983	Patrick Billingsley
1984	Ingram Olkin
1985	Oscar Kempthorne
1986	Paul Meier
1987	Ronald Pyke
1988	Bradley Efron
1989	Ramanathan Gnanadesikan
1990	Shanti S. Gupta
1991	David O. Siegmund
1992	Willem van Zwet
1993	Larry Brown
1994	Stephen Stigler
1995	David R. Brillinger
1996	James O. Berger
1997	Nancy Reid
1998	Persi Diaconis
1999	Stephen Fienberg

21st century
2000	Morris Eaton
2001	Bernard Silverman
2002	Iain M. Johnstone
2003	S. R. S. Varadhan
2004	Terry Speed
2005	Louis Chen Hsiao Yun
2006	Thomas G. Kurtz
2007	Jim Pitman
2008	Jianqing Fan
2009   Nanny Wermuth
2010	J. Michael Steele
2011   Peter Gavin Hall
2012   Ruth J. Williams
2013   Hans-Rudolf Künsch
2014   Bin Yu
2015 	Erwin Bolthausen
2016 	Richard Davis
2017   Jon Wellner
2018   Alison Etheridge
2019   Xiao-Li Meng
2020   Susan Murphy
2021   Regina Liu

External links
Past Executive Committee Members

References
 IMS Handbook for Officers, Editors, Council Members and Committee Chairs

 
Institute of Mathematical Statistics
Statistics-related lists
Lists of members of learned societies